Stephen Hallet Willard  (1894–1966) was an American painter and photographer who produced many images of Western scenery, especially desert views. Willard latter published many of these same images as linen postcards, printed by Curt Teich. He photographed the deserts and mountains of the West for 58 years. His mastery of the black and white photograph, combined with his passion for the landscape, translates into a body of work documenting remote areas of the West few Americans had seen or visited.

Born in Earlville, Illinois, Willard was raised in Corona, California. By the time Willard graduated from Corona High School in 1912, he had developed the skills needed for a career in photography. During the next few years, he made several important photographic trips through the wilderness areas of the Sierra Nevada. In 1921, Willard married Beatrice Armstrong, and after a year of traveling and photographing the deserts of the Southwest, they settled permanently in Palm Springs and opened a studio and gallery. In 1925 their daughter Beatrice Willard was born, she would become a noted American doctor of botany specializing in high alpine and arctic tundra.

For the next twenty-five years Stephen traveled throughout the Colorado and Mojave Deserts and developed a passion for photographing the desert. To escape the summer heat, he and his wife established a second gallery in Mammoth Lakes and seasonally worked in both locations photographing the mountains in the summer and the desert in the winter. Willard regarded photography as a fine art and himself as an artist.

In 1947 Willard sold his Palm Springs home to Patricia and Chester Moorten who would develop the property into the Moorten Botanical Gardens. Willard then moved to the Owens Valley, where he died in 1966.

In 1999, Dr. Beatrice Willard donated her father's life's work to the Palm Springs Art Museum, then called the Palm Springs Desert Museum. The gift of over 16,000 items included original glass and film negatives; vintage photographs; hand-colored lantern slides; photo-paintings; postcards; stereographs; cameras, lenses and other photographic equipment; and personal papers and memorabilia including maps, traveling cases, correspondence, and publications.

References 

20th-century American photographers
20th-century American painters
People from Earlville, Illinois
People from Corona, California
People from Palm Springs, California
People from Mammoth Lakes, California
Owens Valley
1894 births
1966 deaths